Holdstock is a surname. Notable people with the surname include:

 Adrian Holdstock (born 1970), South African cricketer and umpire
 Pauline Holdstock (born 1948), British-Canadian writer
 Robert Holdstock (1948–2009), English writer
 Roy Holdstock (born 1955), English rugby league player